Elymus dahuricus (also called Dahurian wildrye or asiatic wildrye) is a species of perennial herb and a member of the flowering plant family Poaceae. The species has a stand life from 3 to 4 years.

The species was first described by Nikolai Turczaninow (sometimes written  Nikolai Turczaninov) in 1838.

The species is widespread in central and Eastern Asia. This species has recently been grown in the Great plains of the United States and the prairie provinces in Canada. It has also been introduced to the Baltic states.

It has several subspecies and varieties.

References 

dahuricus
Taxa named by Nikolai Turczaninow
Plants described in 1838